Goodricke is a surname. Notable people with the surname include:

People
John Goodricke
Thomas Goodricke
Sir Henry Goodricke, 2nd Baronet
Goodricke baronets

Others
Holyoake-Goodricke baronets
3116 Goodricke
Goodricke-Pigott Observatory
Goodricke College, York - a college of the University of York.
Goodricke National Chess Academy